The Employment Rights Act 1996 (c. 18) is a United Kingdom Act of Parliament passed by the Conservative government to codify existing law on individual rights in UK labour law.

History
Previous statutes, dating from the Contracts of Employment Act 1963, included the Redundancy Payments Act 1965, the Employment Protection Act 1975 and the Wages Act 1986. It deals with rights that most employees can get when they work, including unfair dismissal, reasonable notice before dismissal, time off rights for parenting, redundancy and more. It was amended substantially by the Labour government since 1997, to include the right to request flexible working time. This coincides with the Rights at Work Act 1995.

Part I, Employment particulars
An employee has an employment contract. ERA 1996 section 1(2) states, that the main terms of the contract must be in writing and provided to the employee within two months of the start of their employment. This document is called a "written statement of particulars". It confirms the main express terms of the employment contract. Whilst not definitive of the entire contract, the written statement is intended to be a guide for employees' of their rights, so that they know what kind of terms and conditions of employment to expect. But it is also meant to provide an evidential basis on which to bring a claim for the breach of some right in a court or employment tribunal.

Employers, in particular those in a small business environment, often make an error in believing that the "Written Statement of Particulars" - usually known as the terms and conditions of employment are "The Contract".  The requirement in law therefore to produce the written express terms is often forgotten as they have the basis of a contract in place.  Common practice is for a combined document "Contract of Employment" which provides the "Written Statement of Particulars" to be provided for the employee, which covers all the legal requirements.

Parts IVA and V, Disclosures and detriment
This part provides protection against "detriment" suffered because of disclosing information for public benefit. These measures were originally added by the Public Interest Disclosure Act 1998 and are intended to provide broad protection to employees to report criminal offences, failures to abide by legal obligations, miscarriages of justice, health and safety violations, or environmental damage (s43B). This does not give employees a right to commit a criminal offence in disclosing information, nor to breach the obligations of legally protected professional privilege (as might apply between a doctor and patient, or a lawyer and client).

Parts IV, VI and VII, Sundays, betting, time off  and suspension
Paid time off work for public duties (e.g. jury duty), antenatal care, and training. (Part VI)
Dismissal related to health and safety or asserting statutory rights and dismissal related to a request for flexible working are to be considered automatically unfair under the ERA.

Part IX, Dismissal notice and reasons
Employees have a right to reasonable notice before having their contracts terminated under s.86. At present this means everyone should get a minimum of 1 week's notice before being dismissed if they have worked for the employer for more than a month. After 2 years, the minimum is 2 weeks' notice.  After 3 years, 3 weeks' notice, and so on, up to a maximum of twelve weeks' notice. Many employees will have higher notice periods in their contracts, or under the protection of collective agreements established by the workplace union. It is important to note that these minimum periods are reciprocal - there is a "mutuality of obligation" - and so employees are also required to give such reasonable notice. However nothing prevents employers giving pay in lieu of notice if it is expressly provided for in the employee's contract of employment, staff handbook, or other relevant documents. Both parties can also agree within that period to waive their rights.

Both this right and the right to written particulars of one's contract of employment were introduced through the Contracts of Employment Act 1963.

Part X, Unfair dismissal

Employees have a right under s94 of the Act not to be unfairly dismissed. This is probably the most important right, because it would usually be under an action after dismissal that a former employee would complain that his other rights were breached. Firstly, it is unusual to commence litigation against an employer while still working for them. Secondly, some rights such as the right to reasonable notice before dismissal (s.86) can logically only be breached when someone is dismissed.

The reasons laid out that an employer can dismiss are in s.98(2). Fair reasons to dismiss an employee are if it,

So there is no restriction on management's right to dismiss (for instance, giving reasonable notice) if the employee is (a) just bad at his job, (b) not a nice person to work with (c) is redundant (see below) or (d) the employer is forced to sack someone because of a law (this last one does not come up often). An important detail, however is that an employer may also dismiss, under s.98(1) for "some other substantial reason".

Most dismissals take place for legitimate business reasons, because the employer will no longer require staff, or maybe because times are bad and the employer can no longer afford to pay. There may be the possibility of claiming redundancy (see below). But employers will usually be happy to write a reference. If they do there is an obligation to be accurate and fair, and that means not providing a so-called "kiss of death" reference on to the next potential employer: if only bad things can be said, nothing should be said at all (see the case, Spring v Guardian Assurance plc).

Complaints to a tribunal
The way to enforce a claim for unfair dismissal is at an employment tribunal. An employee who is dismissed may also have breach of contract claim(s), based on common law. Common law claim(s) may be brought in a county court. Employment tribunals are spread around the country, in most towns. The right to bring a case falls under Part X, Chapter 2, s.111.

The case of Beasley v National Grid Electricity Transmission upheld the argument that the time limit in Section 111(2)(a) operates absolutely in circumstances where it is reasonably practicable to comply with it: applications which are slightly late in being presented (88 seconds in the case of Beasley's application) are nevertheless late and fall out of the jurisdiction of the tribunal.

Settlement Agreements
The Settlement Agreement is a new concept which replaces the former "Compromise Agreement". Section 111A(2) of the ERA 1996 (as amended) provides for "Pre-termination Negotiations" that are: "any offers made or discussions held, before the termination of the employment in question, vita a view to it being terminated on terms agreed between the employer and the employee".

The new provisions, which came into force on 29 July 2013, allow an employer to seek agreement with an employee for the latter's dismissal, thereby avoiding any risk of tribunal litigation for wrongful or unfair dismissal. The employee is invited to attend a meeting and may bring a companion (a fellow employee or a trade union officer). The employer, having discussed the issues, can make a written offer of termination, and the employee should be given 10 days to consider. The negotiations are confidential and "without prejudice". A Settlement Agreement is enforceable, but the employer is advised to have a "clawback" clause to allow recovery of any termination sums paid should evidence of misdeeds by the employee later arise. The discussions must observe ACAS Code of Practice 4 guidelines on settlement agreements; failure to comply may amount to "improper behaviour" by the employer, allowing the employee to renege on the agreement.

Part XI, Redundancy payments

Section 135 of the Act gives employees a right to redundancy payments. This means when their jobs have become obsolete and employer should compensate them, provided they have become an established employee. The qualifying period for redundancy is having worked for two years with the same employer (s.155). You are not entitled to redundancy if you have simply reached retiring age (s.156). And nothing prevents the employer from making a dismissal for misconduct or capability, as outlined under the fairness provisions for dismissal (s.98).

The amount of redundancy is based on a length of service calculation and age. For each year you have worked while you were under 21 years old, you get half a week's pay. For each year between ages 21 and 40, one week's pay. For each year over 40, one and a half week's pay (s.162). However, there is an upper limit set on what can be considered a week's pay, which is approximately the same as a week on the minimum wage (if you were made redundant on or before 31 January 2011, it was £380 per week - from 1 February 2011 to 31 January 2012, it was £400 - currently it is £508, before tax).

Part XII, Employer insolvency
This right, under section 182, to compensation for lost earnings is for when the employer goes broke. It applies in the unlucky cases where an employer has gone bankrupt or insolvent and there is no money left to pay the staff, who have outstanding pay cheques. The Secretary of State, on behalf of the government, guarantees pay up to a certain maximum, to replace what was lost.

Part XIII, Miscellaneous

Part XIV, Interpretation

The most important point about the Act is that there is some confusion about whom it covers. Most British people will be covered, but often vulnerable workers are not. Under section 230 of the Act the word "employee" is defined to mean somebody with a "contract of employment". This in turn means someone who has a "contract of service". In legal cases since the early 1980s, some judges have placed a restrictive interpretation on what that means. The opposite of a "contract of service" is a "contract for services", and it is meant to draw the line between someone who is working for another, on their account, under their control and someone who is working on their own account, controlling their own work. In other words, it is meant to be the difference between the truly "employed" and the "self employed".

In many cases, low paid, vulnerable workers, especially agency workers have been held to fall outside the scope of those rights in the Act which are only for "employees". This is because some judges have taken the view that there was not sufficient "control" or "mutuality of obligation" to establish a contract of employment. What those judges have meant by "mutuality of obligation" is that the terms of the contract, especially an obligation to work or not work at any given time and the promise of work in future, were not reciprocal enough. So in O'Kelly v Trusthouse Forte plc [1983] ICR 728, Sir John Donaldson MR held that some waiters who were hired through an agency to do dinner functions were not "employees" (either of the function hall or the agency) because they did not, technically, have to turn up to work for a shift, and they could be sacked at any time. Sir John Donaldson MR said therefore, that the contract lacked "mutuality" and could not be described as one between an "employee" and "employer". The legal effect was to put them in the same boat as the "self employed" and that they were not covered by the Act. The practical effect was they had no right to fair dismissal and could be sacked for organising a trade union.

But other judges have said other things. In Nethermere (St Neots) Ltd v Gardiner [1984] ICR 612, part-time workers were sewing pockets onto Nethermere company's trousers. The sewing machines were provided and they were paid by the piece. There was disagreement over holiday pay and they  were removed  . Stephenson LJ decided (at 623) "There must, in my judgment, be an irreducible minimum of obligation on each side to create a contract of service." And what he meant by this was an exchange of wages for work and sufficient control to make establish the employee-employer relationship. He did not use the "mutuality" concept, or if he did, he used it to mean the exchange of wages for work, and no more.

There is considerable debate about where the scope of employment rights really lie. Most people will have a contract of employment, and fall squarely within the "employee" category. But it will not apply to professional self-employed people at the top end of the labour market, and it is uncertain whether it always applies to those working through agencies and those whose jobs make them vulnerable.

Case law 
Section 139 of the Act was at issue in ‘’Murray v Foyle Meats Ltd’’ (1999), where the House of Lords determined that an employee’s responsibilities as defined in their employment contract were not at issue when a lawful redundancy procedure was undertaken, but what the employee’s actual day-to-day responsibilities are.

Section 20 of the act was at issue in Cairns v Visteon UK Ltd (2007) where the Employment Appeal Tribunal held that an agency worker could not claim unfair dismissal.

See also
UK labour law
UK agency worker law
Temporary and Agency Workers (Equal Treatment) Bill

Notes

External links
 The full text of the act
 A summary of the rights conferred by the act
 A summary of the rights conferred by all relevant UK employment legislation

United Kingdom labour law
United Kingdom Acts of Parliament 1996
1996 in labor relations